Cyclooctadiene iridium chloride dimer is an organoiridium compound with the formula [Ir(μ2-Cl)(COD)]2, where COD is the diene 1,5-cyclooctadiene (C8H12). It is an orange-red solid that is soluble in organic solvents.  The complex is used as a precursor to other iridium complexes, some of which are used in homogeneous catalysis. The solid is air-stable but its solutions degrade in air.

Preparation, structure, reactions
The compound is prepared by heating hydrated iridium trichloride and cyclooctadiene in alcohol solvent.  In the process, Ir(III) is reduced to Ir(I).

In terms of its molecular structure, the iridium centers are square planar as is typical for a d8 complex.  The Ir2Cl2 core is folded with a dihedral angle of 86°.  The molecule crystallizes in yellow-orange and red-orange polymorphs; the latter one is more common.

The complex is widely used precursor to other iridium complexes.  A notable derivative is Crabtree's catalyst.  The chloride ligands can also be replaced with methoxide to give cyclooctadiene iridium methoxide dimer, Ir2(OCH3)2(C8H12)2. The cyclooctadiene ligand is prone to isomerize in cationic complexes of the type [(C8H12)IrL2]+.

See also
 Chlorobis(cyclooctene)iridium dimer
 Cyclooctadiene rhodium chloride dimer

References

Homogeneous catalysis
Coordination complexes
Cyclooctadiene complexes
Organoiridium compounds
Chlorides